The Marxist–Leninist Italian Communist Party (Partito Comunista Italiano Marxista-Leninista, PCIM-L) is anti-revisionist Marxist-Leninist communist party in Italy. The party was founded on December 3, 1999 by the Centre of Marxist Culture and Initiative (Centro di Cultura e Iniziativa Marxista).

The party is based in Forio, a commune in the province of Naples. It was founded by Domenico Savio, an anti-revisionist communist who favors a strict interpretation of the ideology in accordance with the teachings of Karl Marx, Friedrich Engels, Vladimir Lenin and Joseph Stalin. In October 2004, Savio and his PCIM-L managed to obtain 2,244 votes (6.9%) during the Chamber of Deputies supplementary election in the college of Napoli 1 - Ischia.

In the 2006 general election PCI M-L ran a list in the Campania region for the Italian Senate, with Savio as the head of the list. PCIM-L got 26,029 votes (0.856% of the vote in that region, 0.08% of the national vote).

In May 2013 Savio ran for mayor of Forio, getting the 12,89% of votes and was elected as municipal councilor. In June 2018 Savio ran again for major of Forio, only getting 2,33% of votes and thus losing his seat.

On 13 March 2020 Domenico Savio died at eighty years of age, and the party is now headed by his son Gennaro Savio.

References

 External links Partito Comunista Italiano Marxista-Leninista''

Political parties in Campania
Anti-revisionist organizations
Stalinist parties
Far-left politics in Italy
Political parties established in 1999
1999 establishments in Italy
Communist parties in Italy